The nineteenth series of Made in Chelsea, a British structured-reality television programme began airing on 23 March 2020, and after being cut short due to the COVID-19 pandemic, concluded on 27 April 2020 following six episodes. Ahead of the series it was announced that original cast members Ollie Locke and Alexandra "Binky" Felstead would be returning to the series. Tiff Watson, Gareth Lock and Jane Felstead also returned to the show. Cast members James Taylor and Maeva D’Ascanio did not featured in this series after it was confirmed they would be taking a break from the show.

The series focused on the relationship troubles of Sam and Zara following the return of Sam's ex-girlfriend Tiff, as well as the feud between Olivia and Melissa. It also included Habbs struggling to come to terms with her best friend Emily dating her ex-boyfriend Harvey, and Ollie and Gareth plan their dream wedding.

Cast

Episodes

{| class="wikitable plainrowheaders" style="width:100%; background:#fff;"
! style="background:#A62C03;"| Seriesno.
! style="background:#A62C03;"| Episodeno.
! style="background:#A62C03;"| Title
! style="background:#A62C03;"| Original air date
! style="background:#A62C03;"| Duration
! style="background:#A62C03;"| UK viewers

|}

Ratings
Catch-up service totals were added to the official ratings.

External links

References

2020 British television seasons
Made in Chelsea seasons